Jean-Paul Anciaux (born 17 July 1946 in Le Creusot, Saône-et-Loire) is a member of the National Assembly of France.  He represents the Saône-et-Loire department, and is a member of the Union for a Popular Movement.

References

1946 births
Living people
People from Le Creusot
Politicians from Bourgogne-Franche-Comté
Rally for the Republic politicians
Union for a Popular Movement politicians
Debout la France politicians
Deputies of the 10th National Assembly of the French Fifth Republic
Deputies of the 12th National Assembly of the French Fifth Republic
Deputies of the 13th National Assembly of the French Fifth Republic